Godefroy Jean Henri Louis de Blonay (25 July 1869, Niederschöntal, Switzerland – 14 February 1937, Biskra, French Algeria) was an important early member of the International Olympic Committee.

Career
From 1899 he was the first Swiss member on the International Olympic Committee (IOC).
He was to be on the committee for 38 years until his death in 1937, being the 24th on the roll of members since 1884; Pierre de Coubertin is number one. In 1912 de Blonay was one of the founders of the Swiss Olympic Association and from 1912 to 1915 he was its first president.

Baron de Blonay was for a time one of the closest confidants of the IOC's second president Pierre de Coubertin. When de Coubertin joined the French army in 1916 de Blonay became acting president of the IOC. Earlier, when de Coubertin nearly ran out of money and took a back seat, de Blonay had been appointed to run an International Olympic executive committee, in lieu of the president. However, it has been suggested that he upset de Coubertin by over-stretching the powers of this committee and it was this that may have caused him not to have been chosen to succeed as the third IOC president in 1925.

Wife and family
In Neuchâtel on 24 September 1901 he married Elisabeth Sophie de Salis (Neuchâtel, 21 May 1880 - 30 March 1967). She was the only surviving child of Count Peter de Salis (second son of Peter, 5th Count de Salis-Soglio) by his second wife Agnes Louisa La Trobe (d. 5 May 1916, ebendort), daughter of Governor Charles Joseph La Trobe, CB, by his wife Sophie de Montmollin.

They had four children and lived at the château de Grandson, Vaud, near Yverdon-les-Bains, Switzerland.

References

The Official History of the Olympic Games and the IOC: Athens to Beijing, 1894–2008, by David Miller, 2008.

1869 births
1937 deaths
International Olympic Committee members
Swiss nobility
Presidents of the International Olympic Committee
People from Basel-Landschaft